Second Harbour Crossing is the name given to the proposed second transport link across the Waitematā Harbour in Auckland, New Zealand. The second link would supplement the Auckland Harbour Bridge which is nearly at capacity and also provide more redundancy and public transport linkages between the Auckland city centre and the North Shore. It is sometimes also called the Third Harbour Crossing, as there is already an Upper Harbour Bridge (or Greenhithe Bridge). More recently, it is named Additional Waitematā Harbour Crossing (AWHC) in planning documents.

Proposals were discussed soon after the Auckland Harbour Bridge was first built, which quickly reached capacity before being widened. By 2008, the proposed crossing was narrowed down from around 160 alignment options to a multi-tunnel link somewhat east of the existing bridge. However, the project was at least a decade away from funding as of the late 2000s. Once started, the project would likely take between 5 and 15 years to complete, according to the NZ Transport Agency. In late 2009, the National government declared it a priority in the new 20-year infrastructure plan. In June 2013, prime minister John Key announced a new Harbour Tunnel to be completed by 2025-2030 and the alignment decided by December 2013.

Background
At the time the clip-on additions to the Auckland Harbour Bridge were being installed in 1969, predictions noted that the increased bridge capacity would last only until about 1985. Even with the clip-on sections and the traffic management in place, the Harbour Bridge was soon experiencing congestion during rush hours again. Various plans were proposed for a second link in the following decades, including one connecting from Meola Reef to Birkenhead, though the idea was abandoned in the 1970s after public outcry.

It was expected that traffic congestion would only get worse as North Shore City grew further and Auckland City became more densely settled. Therefore, there was growing pressure for another harbour crossing. It has also been suggested that reliance on the harbour bridge as a single asset (which might experience failure via an earthquake or other disaster) is not in the interests of either Auckland or New Zealand.

However, a 2007 study by the Auckland Regional Council (ARC) showed that peak hour traffic volumes were actually down compared to the early 1990s. The morning peak (from 7 am – 9 am) dipped from 17,048 vehicles inbound (towards Auckland City) in 1991 to 16,032 vehicles in 2006 (though the opposing traffic climbed from 5,872 to 10,555 vehicles). At the same time, the afternoon peak (from 4 pm – 6 pm) fell from 17,092 vehicles outbound to 16,759 (though again, the opposing traffic rose substantially, from 6,944 to 10,991). This was generally attributed to travel demand management, to drivers avoiding peak hours, and to increased bus usage since the construction of the hugely successful Northern Busway – 40% of peak time passengers across the bridge were being carried by bus rather than cars. By 2017, more than 50% of people travelling across the bridge were travelling by bus. This has raised doubts about whether a second crossing is necessary.

It was considered that the future timing of an additional harbour crossing would be delayed by the completion of the Western Ring Route (a combination of upgraded and new motorway sections skirting the western edge of the harbour and suburbs), which would provide some relief for traffic travelling between the North Shore and West Auckland. This route was completed in 2017 with the opening of the Waterview Connection on 2 July 2017.

The City of Auckland District Plan of 4 October 2011 (updated from 1999) states that a second harbour crossing is to be delayed (district plans are a type of document that is updated at best once or twice every decade):

The Auckland City Council will work with Transit New Zealand, the ARC, and the North Shore City Council to develop and implement measures, designed to optimise the future use of the existing Harbour Bridge and its approaches, for the peak period movement of people. This is to avoid or substantially delay the need to construct a second crossing of the Waitematā Harbour.

Running counter to those delays, pressure for earlier completion of a crossing came from another source. In 2017, Auckland Transport's projections indicated that the North Shore's Northern Busway would reach maximum capacity in 2026, twenty years earlier than originally expected. AT's report said that increased patronage would "manifest in overcapacity conditions and poor operational performances" at Albany, Sunnynook and Akoranga stations. A decision on a timeline for conversion of the busway to a rail link was expected to be announced before the end of 2017, with an AT spokesman saying that conversion to rail could not take place before the second crossing (AWHC) was built.

2019 reappraisal
In 2019, about 170,000 vehicles were crossing the bridge each day, including 11,000 trucks and more than 1,000 buses. The following statistics were for the 7–9am morning peak period:
38% of all bridge users were bus passengers
58% of bridge users bound for Auckland CBD (not to the south or west) were bus passengers
20,000 people travelled in cars to the CBD (unchanged for 25 years)
53% of car users were travelling past the CBD to southern or western destinations
11,000 truck crossings rising rapidly and expected to reach 26,000 in 2046

A paper published by the NZ Transport Agency said that with private vehicle crossings static due to congestion on feeder roads and with the rise in public transport crossings, it would make more sense to drop the road-plus-rail proposal and build a rail crossing only. With freight volume and number of trucks rising, heavy rail might be justifiable, rather than a light rail passenger service.

Discussions

Alignment studies 

Several solutions have been proposed in the past, including building another bridge alongside the existing one, a tunnel, or combinations of both. Following a detailed scoping study undertaken in 1996, Transit New Zealand identified its preferred options for a new crossing – either a new bridge approximately 500 m west of the bridge connecting to the North-Western Motorway (SH16) via a tunnel underneath Ponsonby and Grey Lynn, or a tunnel slightly to the east of the bridge connecting to the Central Motorway Junction via twin cut-and-cover tunnels under the western CBD / Victoria Park.

In 2006, Transit New Zealand noted that its 10-year plan, at that time being consulted on, would include funding for another study into a second harbour crossing. This study was declared to include the possibility of landing a future tunnel underneath the Tank Farm, with a connecting tunnel to south of Victoria Park. Costs are estimated at NZ$3 billion. Some commentators like Brian Rudman have noted that it would make the most sense to keep the new crossing for public transport only, possibly to connect with a rail tunnel to Britomart Transport Centre. This statement was largely supported by North Shore City mayor George Wood, who noted that public transport provision on the new crossing (including the possibility for light rail or heavy rail to connect to Britomart) had been part of North Shore City Council's plans for many years.

A possible tunnel between Mechanics Bay and Northcote was also to be considered in the feasibility studies, but faced increasing criticism from local groups, as well as problems due to the denser residential zones and geographic difficulties faced on such an alignment.

In December 2007, Transit New Zealand noted that the more than 160 options had been narrowed down to only two alignments. The first possible alignment (of approximately 4.5 km length) would be a parallel link several hundred meters directly to the east of the existing bridge (either as a bridge or a tunnel), while the second alignment (of approximately 6.5 km length) would start in the same general environs in North Shore City, but travel diagonally southeastwards to link up with the motorway at Grafton Gully, east of the Auckland CBD. The second option, due to the need to cross shipping lanes, would need to be a tunnel. It could also possibly be connected to the CBD via a side branch tunnel (for use by public transport only). North Shore City has noted that it would prefer a tunnel option for aesthetic reasons, and to potentially emplace light rail within the tunnel at a future stage.

A tunnel had been proposed as early as 1920, during discussions about extension of Auckland's rail network.

Recommended option 

In mid-2008, the Waitematā Harbour Crossing study group released their recommended option (2C), which would connect from the existing Esmonde and Onewa motorway interchanges on the North Shore City side to Auckland City, reaching land in the southwestern part of the Western Reclamation (though the links may continue as tunnels for some further distance, likely going under Victoria Park). The option selected from several hundred considered alignments foresees four separate tunnels, two for motor vehicles and two for public transport. Due to the reduced costs of narrow-diameter tunnels driven by modern tunneling methods compared to providing similar capacity in one or more large tunnels, this option was considered the most economic. The characteristics of the recommended options are:

two motorway tunnels (three lanes northbound in one tunnel, three lanes southbound in the other), carrying State Highway 1
two public transport tunnels (rail in the recommended option), connecting Britomart with a new North Shore City rail system
demolition of the Victoria Park Viaduct and deemphasising of the Auckland Harbour Bridge for some through routes
provision of a new rail station for the future Wynyard Quarter at the southern edge of the new development
an estimated cost of NZ$3.7 to NZ$4.1 billion, though the links could be built in stages, reducing immediate costs

The study also assumes that by 2041, the volume of trips over the harbour will increase by 80% from current (2000s) levels, and estimate that the public transport share on the link would rise from a current 15% to then 30%.

In mid 2009, NZTA was reported to be preparing land designations for the tunnel option, to safeguard the route and ensure progress on the Western Reclamation did not negatively affect the future tunnel and vice versa. Transport and Associate Infrastructure Minister Steven Joyce also noted that a decision would be made in 2009 as to whether the crossing would be included in NZTA's new 20-year plan. On 2 December 2009, NZTA announced that designations would be protected for the four-tube tunnel option, though funding to build them was not currently allocated in the budgets, and no future date for construction was announced.

Bridge alternative 

During the public discussions in 2007, an interest group put forward a proposal to build a new, much larger bridge to the east of the existing harbour bridge, and demolish the latter. They argued that the new bridge, which would be about 50% longer than the existing one, could be constructed to provide for dedicated public transport (including light rail, which they claimed would allow a tripling of the total capacity in people then being moved over the existing bridge), as well as for cyclists and pedestrians. Significantly, they argued that the new bridge would more or less pay for itself, by freeing up new residential land occupied by several kilometres of motorway approaches in some of the most sought-after Auckland locations like Saint Marys Bay. The proponents claimed that the bridge would free up more than 35 hectares and open up 3.3 km of shoreline, a prize which would more than make up for the fact that the plans for the Western Reclamation redevelopment would in this case find themselves partly compromised by a major motorway in its area. The proposed bridge would also be cheaper to operate, and unlike a tunnel, would not need emission vents.

The proposed bridge design, a cantilever spar cable-stayed bridge, was put forward by the Jasmax architectural firm, which noted that the 'Anzac Centenary Bridge' would be buildable in time for the 100-year memorial of the Gallipoli landings in 1915.

Some attendees at a 2009 bridge conference held by the NZ Transport Agency in Auckland remarked that a bridge would be more beneficial to Auckland in some ways, and would have reduced operating costs compared to a tunnel solution.

In October 2009, the bridge option again surfaced in the public eye, with a group of backers again suggesting that a bridge would be a better option from an urban design, and even from a transport point of view. Critics noted that the proposal would delay other transport plans in the region due to the funding required for it, especially for a 2015 target. The then mayor of North Shore City, Andrew Williams, and the then Chairman of the Auckland Regional Council, Mike Lee, both opposed the reconsideration of existing decisions that had been in favour of a tunnel. The then mayor of Auckland City, John Banks, also favoured the tunnel option, though he did not outright oppose the bridge idea, while the then mayor of Manukau City, Len Brown, considered the bridge proposal worthy of consideration.

The more detailed concept the bridge group proposed in late 2009 included eight traffic lanes (including separate truck and bus lanes), two light rail tracks (in the bridge deck) as well as walking and cycling paths, possibly with travelators. Backers claimed that the bridge, estimated by them at NZ$2–3 billion, would be significantly cheaper than a tunnel for approximately NZ$4 billion.

In December 2009, it was announced by NZTA that designations would be sought for the tunnel options, though it was noted that this did not have to preclude a future bridge option, but was solely an exercise to protect the tunnel possibilities against conflict with future development in the Western Reclamation area. The lobby group for the bridge option regarded as a success the fact that the transport minister did not preclude it, though their original timeframe was also modified, now aiming for a construction start by 2015. In March 2010, tendering for a new study was announced, after Minister of Transport Steven Joyce apparently instructed NZTA to reopen the bridge/tunnel debate. The decision of the minister was criticised in an editorial in The New Zealand Herald for wasting time and money, since the previous study had already, at cost of over $1 million, conclusively ruled out a bridge as a good solution.

Other modes 

Plans intend that with the construction of the new motorway links via the second crossing, capacity on the existing bridge be freed up for walking and cycling links. However, advocacy groups have noted that any second crossing would not be built for possibly decades to come, if at all, and thus should not detract from providing the links sooner.

See also 
General
Public transport in Auckland
Transport in Auckland
North Shore Line, New Zealand

Specific
Central Motorway Junction, the major motorway junction connecting southeast of the bridge
Newmarket Viaduct, similarly important traffic bottleneck on other side of Auckland CBD
Western Reclamation, large industrial area east of the bridge, possible site of 2nd crossing

References 

Proposed undersea tunnels in Oceania
Road tunnels in New Zealand
Transport in Auckland
Proposed transport infrastructure in New Zealand
Proposed tunnels in New Zealand
Transport buildings and structures in the Auckland Region
Auckland waterfront
Auckland CBD